Arkhipova is a rural locality (a village) in Oshibskoye Rural Settlement, Kudymkarsky District, Perm Krai, Russia. The population was 54 as of 2010.

Geography 
Devina is the nearest rural locality.

References 

Rural localities in Kudymkarsky District